The EG Awards of 2009 are the fourth Annual The Age EG (Entertainment Guide) Awards and took place at the Prince of Wales on Friday 20 November 2009.

Hall of Fame inductees
Painters and Dockers

The Painters and Dockers formed in 1982 for a one-off benefit gig to pay a friend's parking fines. They went on to develop a reputation for wild shows and the ability to play anywhere— from suburban trains for Rockin' the Rails gigs, a boat for Rockin' the Docks, a float at the Moomba Parade to the 20th floor of a building site and on a picket line. The original lineup last played more than 20 years ago, but felt that they never had proper closure on their career.

Award nominees and winners
Winners indicated below in boldface

References

2009 in Australian music
2009 music awards
Music Victoria Awards